Peter V. "Pete" Cacchione (November 1, 1897 – November 6, 1947) was an American communist labor leader who was elected to the New York City Council in 1941. He was born to Italian-American immigrant family in Syracuse, New York, on November 1, 1897, and grew up in Sayre, Pennsylvania. He became director of sports activities for the Catholic Welfare Council, later becoming a steel worker in Bethlehem, a street car conductor, riveter and later a trainman on the Lackawanna Railroad. According to fellow communist city councilman Benjamin J. Davis and newspaper accounts, Cacchione served in World War I. Cacchione joined the Communist Party USA in 1932 and led a delegation of the communist affiliated Workers Ex-Service Men's League in the 1932 Washington D.C. bonus march. He became National Commander of the League in 1935. Cacchione moved to New York City, Brooklyn in 1932 and was later elected Brooklyn County Chairman of the Communist Party USA in 1934. After relocating to Brooklyn, he was elected Kings County Chairman of the Communist Party in 1936.

In 1936, New York City voters amended the City Charter to implement the proportional representation system for council elections beginning with the 1937 election cycle.  Cacchione ran that year losing by a slim margin of only 300 votes. He ran again in 1939 but was thrown off the ballot along with all the other communist candidates on procedural technicalities. He was finally elected for the first time in 1941 and re-elected in 1943 and 1945; the last time receiving the full quota of 74,000 votes. Cacchione served until his sudden death from a heart attack in 1947 after attending a meeting of the City Council.

Immediately after his election in 1941, Councilman Hugh Quinn, Democrat of Queens, announced that he would challenge Cacchione's right to sit on the Council pursuant to the Devaney Law. Other Council members opined that they preferred him to openly disseminate his political doctrines on the council rather than to do so through "underground channels".

Despite Cacchione's political affiliation, he was genuinely popular and well-liked by his fellow councilmen. Cacchione was an attorney by trade and married to his wife Dorothy with one son, Bernard, born in 1940.

References

External links 
Pete Cacchione -- his record

1897 births
1946 deaths
American communists
American trade union leaders
American Marxists
American people of Italian descent
New York City Council members
People from Sayre, Pennsylvania
Military personnel from Syracuse, New York
Politicians from the Bronx
20th-century American politicians
Activists from New York (state)
Communist Party USA politicians